(alternatively spelled "Mi Amore") is the 11th single by Japanese entertainer Akina Nakamori. Written by Chinfa Kan and Naoya Matsuoka, the single was released on March 8, 1985, by Warner Pioneer through the Reprise label. It was also the lead single from her eighth studio album D404ME.

Background 
"Meu amor é..." was composed by Naoya Matsuoka, a Japanese Latin fusion musician and jazz pianist. The title is Brazilian Portuguese for "My love". In addition, the single jacket cover uses the title "Mi Amore", as the song was originally titled with the Spanish word "Mi" and the Italian word "Amore". Nakamori's follow-up single "Akaitori Nigeta" is the original version of the song with completely different lyrics.

Nakamori performed the song on the 36th Kōhaku Uta Gassen, making her third appearance on NHK's New Year's Eve special.

Matsuoka recorded "Meu amor é..." as an instrumental on his 1985 compilation album One Last Farewell: Naoya Matsuoka the Best Selection. Nakamori has re-recorded the song for the 1995 compilation True Album Akina 95 Best and the 2002 self-cover compilation Utahime Double Decade. In 2010, she re-recorded the song for the pachinko machine .

Chart performance 
"Meu amor é..." became Nakamori's seventh No. 1 on Oricon's weekly singles chart and sold over 630,700 copies.

Awards 
"Meu amor é..." won the Grand Prix at the 27th Japan Record Awards.

Track listing

Charts

Nana Katase version 

Nana Katase covered "Meu amor é..." as her fifth single, released on March 10, 2004, by Avex Trax as the lead single from her second album Extended. It peaked at No. 39 on Oricon's weekly singles chart.

Track listing
All lyrics are written by Chinfa Kan; all music is composed by Naoya Matsuoka; all music is arranged by Shōichirō Hirata.

Charts

Other cover versions 
 Karyudo covered the song in 1996.

References

External links 
Akina Nakamori
 
 
 

Nana Katase
 
 

1985 singles
1985 songs
2004 singles
Akina Nakamori songs
Japanese-language songs
Songs with lyrics by Chinfa Kan
Warner Music Japan singles
Reprise Records singles
Avex Trax singles
Oricon Weekly number-one singles